Calaunia is a genus of flowering plants belonging to the family Moraceae.

Its native range is Philippines.

Species:

Calaunia negrosensis

References

Moraceae
Moraceae genera